Lekach is a honey-sweetened cake made by Jews, especially for the Jewish holiday of Rosh Hashanah. Known in Hebrew as ugat dvash (עוגת דבש, literally, honey cake), the word lekach (לעקעך) is Yiddish. Lekach is one of the symbolically significant foods traditionally eaten by Ashkenazi Jews at Rosh Hashanah in hopes of ensuring a sweet New Year.

History
Various sorts of cakes sweetened with honey have been known since ancient times, in Egypt, Rome, and the Middle East. Arabs brought these traditions to Sicily and Moorish Spain. In the 11th century, a type of strongly spiced thick cake made from breadcrumbs and honey, resembling panforte, became popular in Italy. Italian Jews brought some of these styles to Western and Central Europe. The earliest known record in a Jewish source of a cake called lekach, from the Middle High German , 'to lick', was in the Medieval ages in Sefer ha-Rokeach by Eleazar ben Judah of Worms, Germany.

Many Ashkenazi versions by the 13th century were influenced by or based on Lebkuchen or Honigkuchen (honey cake) recipes found in Germany. Such heavily spiced cakes, analogous to the English gingerbread, became popular all over medieval Europe in communities of all religions, especially during important feasts and holidays. Lekach has changed drastically over the centuries, such that its current forms bear little resemblance to its ancestors. There are now many variations, ranging from dark and heavy to lighter more delicate versions, though in general it is never frosted. Lekach was brought to the Land of Israel by Ashkenazi immigrants.

Overview

A very traditional honey cake from the Jewish community of Austria contains an equal weight of white rye flour and dark honey, strong Austrian coffee instead of water, cloves, cinnamon, allspice, and golden raisins in the loaf, with slivered almonds on top of the loaf. It also has a fair number of eggs, vegetable oil (usually corn oil), salt, and baking powder.

Variations

Recipes vary widely.  Lekach is usually a dense, loaf-shaped cake, but some versions are similar to sponge cake or pound cake, with the addition of honey and spices, sometimes with coffee or tea for coloring. Other versions are more like gingerbread, pain d'épices, or lebkuchen.

See also
Jewish cuisine
Jewish apple cake

References

Ashkenazi Jewish cuisine
Israeli cuisine
Jewish desserts
Jewish baked goods
Cakes
Honey cakes